Take This Job and Shove It is a 1981 American comedy film directed by Gus Trikonis and starring Robert Hays, Barbara Hershey, Art Carney, David Keith, and Dale Cross in his big screen debut.

The film was named after a popular country song, "Take This Job and Shove It", which was written by David Allan Coe and sung by Johnny Paycheck; both men had minor roles in the film.

Plot
A corporate conglomerate called "The Ellison Group" acquires four breweries, all of them experiencing financial trouble. Enter Frank Macklin (Robert Hays), a young manager hired by Ellison to help reorganize one of the ailing breweries, a major employer in his home town. Initially his old friends, who work at the brewery, give him a cold welcome as they think he'll be unable to revitalize the brewery. But when Frank informs them that the brewery is drowning in red ink, and that they may be losing their jobs soon, they welcome him with open arms, and ramp up the brewery's sales and production. The brewery improves so much that the Ellison Group decides to sell it to a Texas oil millionaire, who doesn't know the first thing about running a brewery or — apparently — running a business.

Cast
 Robert Hays as Frank Macklin
 Art Carney as Charlie Pickett
 Barbara Hershey as J.M. Halsted
 David Keith as Harry Meade
 Tim Thomerson as Ray Binkowski
 Martin Mull as Dick Ebersol
 Eddie Albert as Samuel Ellison
 Penelope Milford as Lenore Meade
 David Allan Coe as Mooney
 Lacy J. Dalton as Mrs. Mooney
 Royal Dano as Beeber
 Virgil Frye as Cleach
 James Karen as Loomis
 Len Lesser as Roach
 Suzanne Kent as Charmaine
 Joan Prather as Madelyn
 George Lindsey as semitruck driver
 Johnny Paycheck as Man with hamburger
 Charlie Rich as Hooker
 Fran Ryan as Mrs. Hinkle
 Stephan Meyers as Harry Meade, Jr.
 Bob Chandler as the race flagman

Production
Most of the film was shot in Dubuque, Iowa, and the Dubuque Star Brewery; some minor scenes were shot in Minneapolis, Minnesota. The Dubuque Star Brewery still stands today in the same location. It has been renovated and is now a private bar and grill.

Bigfoot 
Take This Job and Shove It was the first film to feature monster trucks. Bob Chandler's Bigfoot #1 is seen throughout the movie as Ray's pick-up truck. Everett Jasmer's USA-1, credited as "Thunderin' Lightning", is the blue truck at the starting line that (in the script) breaks down when the race starts. Jasmer's daily delivery truck was used as the rival truck to Bigfoot, known as Silver Bullet. Both trucks are shown with 48-inch tires that were the then-standard monster truck tire (as opposed to the 66-inch tires that became standard later). Bob Chandler is seen as the flagman at the beginning of the race, and his family can be seen throughout the picnic sequences.

Release
The film was released by Avco Embassy in the United States on May 15, 1981, and became somewhat of a sleeper hit. The film's final box office total was $17,569,027.

See also
 List of American films of 1981

References

External links
 
 
 

1981 films
1980s English-language films
1981 comedy films
American business films
American comedy films
1980s business films
Culture of Dubuque, Iowa
Embassy Pictures films
Films about beer
Films shot in Iowa
Films shot in Minnesota
Films based on songs
1981 independent films
Films directed by Gus Trikonis
1980s American films